Katherine Sian Moennig (born December 29, 1977) is an American actress. She is best known for her role as Shane McCutcheon on The L Word (2004–2009), as well as Jake Pratt on Young Americans (2000). Moennig played the role of Lena in the Showtime series Ray Donovan from 2013 to 2019. She played a recurring role on Grown-ish on Freeform as Professor Paige Hewson in season 2 and 3. She reprised her role as Shane McCutcheon in The L Word: Generation Q in 2019. Moennig currently hosts podcast PANTS with close friend and L Word co-star, Leisha Hailey.

Personal life
Moennig was born in Philadelphia, Pennsylvania, the daughter of Broadway dancer Mary Zahn and violin-maker William H. Moennig III. Her father's maternal half-sister is actress Blythe Danner, making her a half-first cousin of Gwyneth Paltrow and Jake Paltrow.

Moennig is a lesbian. She is married to musician Ana Rezende.

Career
Moennig moved to New York City at the age of 18 to study at the American Academy of Dramatic Arts.

In 1999, she had the central role in the Our Lady Peace video "Is Anybody Home?". She also took a role in a Fleet Bank commercial, and appeared in a Red Cross Campaign benefiting victims of Hurricane Katrina. Moennig was a presenter at the 17th annual GLAAD awards and appeared at the 10th annual Ribbon of Hope Celebration.

Moennig's first major role was in the television series Young Americans, playing Jake Pratt. She has played multiple lesbian roles: Shane McCutcheon in The L Word; Rosie's (Drew Barrymore) partner Jilly in Everybody's Fine; Candace, the lesbian lover of Sophia Myles' character, in Art School Confidential; and Lena, a press agent who works for Liev Schreiber's character, in Ray Donovan. She has also pursued transgender roles, auditioning for the part of Brandon Teena in Boys Don't Cry, and playing Cheryl Avery, a young transgender woman in the Law & Order: Special Victims Unit episode "Fallacy".

In April 2006, Moennig made her Off Broadway debut as "American Girl", opposite Lee Pace, in Guardians, by Peter Morris. The story is loosely based on that of Lynndie England.

In 2007, the Hetrick-Martin Institute (HMI) produced the documentary My Address: A Look At Gay Youth Homelessness in cooperation with Moennig. Directed by Gigi Nicolas, the documentary explored the experiences of homeless gay youth and the work of the HMI.

In 2009, Moennig joined the cast of the TV series Three Rivers. On November 30, 2009, it was announced that CBS had pulled Three Rivers from the schedule, with no plans to return it. Moennig appeared in an episode of This Just Out in 2010.

In 2013, tomboy clothing range Wildfang launched in America. Moennig was an ambassador for the brand, appearing in the launch video and designing a limited edition pair of boots.

Also in 2013, Moennig joined the cast of the Showtime drama Ray Donovan, starring as Lena, Ray Donovan's assistant.

In 2017, Moennig narrated her first audiobook, The Late Show by Michael Connelly.

In 2019, Moennig reprised her role as Shane McCutcheon in The L Word sequel, The L Word: Generation Q.

Filmography

Film

Television

Theatre

References

External links
 

1977 births
Living people
20th-century American actresses
21st-century American actresses
American lesbian actresses
American people of German descent
Actresses from Philadelphia
American Academy of Dramatic Arts alumni
American film actresses
American stage actresses
American television actresses
LGBT people from Pennsylvania
21st-century LGBT people